Fateh Mohammad Buledi  is a Pakistani politician who was a Member of the Provincial Assembly of Balochistan, from October 2013 to May 2018.He is the son of the great Baloch Nationalist Leader Shaheed Ayub Buledi.

Early life 
He was born on 15 August 1985 in Kech District.

Political career
He was elected unopposed to the Provincial Assembly of Balochistan as a candidate of National Party from Constituency PB-49 Kech-II in by-polls held in October 2013.

References

Living people
Balochistan MPAs 2013–2018
1985 births

((Son of Baloch National Leader Shaheed Mir Muhammad Ayub Buledi))